Pat Nourse (born 1977) is an Australian restaurant critic and food writer. He is the Creative Director for the Melbourne Food & Wine Festival, and was formerly employed by Australian Gourmet Traveller magazine as their chief restaurant critic and deputy editor. He also writes about Australia for the American food magazine Gourmet, and is the Australian member of the voting academy for the World's 50 Best Restaurants. He has been a contributor to The Age Good Food Guide and The Sydney Morning Herald Good Food Guide, among other publications.

Criticism

Nourse has been critical in his reviews of the use of truffle oil and other synthetic food products, and the promotion of shark fin on restaurant menus in Australia.

References

External links
 Gourmet Traveller website

1977 births
Living people
Australian food writers
Restaurant critics